Pottum is an Ortsgemeinde – a community belonging to a Verbandsgemeinde – in the Westerwaldkreis in Rhineland-Palatinate, Germany.

Geography

Pottum lies 5 km northeast of Westerburg on the Wiesensee (lake), near Stahlhofen am Wiesensee. Since 1972 it has belonged to what was then the newly founded Verbandsgemeinde of Westerburg, a kind of collective municipality. Its seat is in the like-named town.

History
In 1062, Pottum, or Patheim, later Pothump, had its first documentary mention.

Politics

The municipal council is made up of 17 council members, including the extraofficial mayor (Bürgermeister), who were elected in a majority vote in a municipal election on 13 June 2004.

Well-known Pottumers
 Annegret Held (writer)
 Prof. Dr.- Ing. Helmut Hoyer (Rector of the Fernuniversität Hagen)
 Erich Müller (well known within the community due to his efforts in the local council and fire brigade)

References

External links
Pottum 
Photo of Pottum am Wiesensee 

Municipalities in Rhineland-Palatinate
Westerwaldkreis